Soulfood Music Distribution GmbH is a German company distributing music and video games as well as related merchandise products. The company's distribution deals usually cover Germany, Austria and Switzerland (G/A/S). The headquarters of the company are located in Hamburg, Germany.

History 
Soulfood Music Distribution was founded in May 2002 by music distribution executives Georg Schmitz and Jochen Richert. From 1990 on, both were employed by then-independent label and distributor Intercord. In 1998, both left the company to build alternative distributor Connected for edel GmbH. Then they created in cooperation with DADC Austria their own distribution service – Soulfood.

Labels 
.

 13th Planet Records
 17 Hippies
 2006 Records
 4RT Music Management
 Ace Records
 AFM Records
 Alfa Matrix
 Ant Acid Audio
 AOR Heaven
 Artist Station Records
 Bad Taste Records
 Beatdown Hardwear 
 Betonkopf Media
 BGO Records
 Bioworld Merchandising
 Blue Rose Records
 Cadiz Music
 Charly
 CHS / Concert Video
 CID
 Classic Rock Distribution
 Clubstar
 Cool D:Vision
 Corazong
 Cyclone Empire
 Deaf & Dumb
 Demolition
 Demon
 Demons Run Amok 
 Distributionz
 Dope Noir
 Dreyfus
 Dritte Wahl
 DRT Entertainment
 Einheit Produktionen
 Enja
 Enja HW
 ESL Music
 Evangeline
 Exile On Mainstream Records
 Fansation
 FOD Records
 Frontiers Records
 G-Stone Recordings
 GLM
 Gottdiscs
 Hamburg Records
 Hopeless Records
 Hypertension
 I Luv Money Records 
 IN-D Records 
 Infacted Recordings 
 Ipecac Recordings 
 Jeepster 
 John Silver 
 JoWooD Productions
 Lifeforce Records 
 Limb Music 
 Listenable Records 
 Locomotive Records 
 Massacre Records 
 Mate in Germany 
 Megapress 
 Metal Heaven 
 Metal Mind Productions 
 Minuswelt 
 Modernsoul 
 Morbid Records 
 Music Avenue
 Nettwerk Music Group
 Neue Zeiten
 Pica Music 
 Premium Records
 Prophecy Productions 
 Psychonaut Records 
 Pure Steel Records
 Purple Records
 Rawhead
 Regain Records 
 Remedy Records 
 ROAR! Rock of Angels Records
 Rockphone Records 
 Rootdown 
 Sanctuary Records
 Season Of Mist 
 Selfmade Records 
 Silverdust Records 
 Skip 
 Smilodon 
 Southern Lord 
 Southern Records
 Spinefarm Records
 Suburban Records
 Swell Creek Records 
 T2 Media 
 Totentanz 
 Touch And Go Records 
 Trisol Music Group
 Trollhorn Records 
 Union Square Music 
 Victory Records
 W-Productions
 Wolkenreise
 Wolverine Records

References

External links 
Soulfood Music Distribution

Record label distributors